Dendrobium bilobum, the two-lobed dendrobium, is a species of orchid of the genus Dendrobium native to Oceania.

It is found in New Guinea, Solomon Islands, Vanuatu, Fiji and New Caledonia. It grows to a maximum size of 0.5 mm.

References

bilobum
Orchids of Oceania
Orchids of New Caledonia
Orchids of New Guinea
Orchids of Papua New Guinea
Flora of the Solomon Islands (archipelago)
Flora of the Southwestern Pacific
Plants described in 1848